Bowley is a surname. Notable people with the surname include:

Arthur Lyon Bowley (1869–1957), English statistician and economist
Flora Juliet Bowley (1881–1966), American actress
Frederick Bowley (Worcestershire cricketer) (1873–1943), English cricketer
James E. Bowley, American academic
Marian Bowley (1911–2002), economist and historian of economic thought
Ted Bowley (1890–1974), cricketer who played for Sussex and England
Will Bowley (born 1984), English rugby player